"Where Were You When I Was Falling in Love" is a popular song written by Jeff Silbar, Sam Lorber and Steve Jobe. It was a hit for singer Lobo and was released as a single in 1979 from his self-titled album.

The song was Lobo's final Top 40 hit on the Billboard Hot 100, where it peaked at No. 23, and his fourth and final No. 1 song on the Adult Contemporary chart, which it topped for two weeks in September/October 1979.

Chart history

See also
List of number-one adult contemporary singles of 1979 (U.S.)

References

1979 singles
1979 songs
Lobo (musician) songs
Songs written by Jeff Silbar
Songs written by Sam Lorber
Song recordings produced by Bob Montgomery (songwriter)
MCA Records singles